The Tamir is a river flowing through the valleys of the Khangai Mountains in the Arkhangai aimag of central Mongolia. The river is the namesake of the Mongolian literature classic by Chadraabalyn Lodoidamba, The Clear Tamir River.

For most of its length, the Tamir is divided into two branches, the Northern Tamir and the Southern Tamir.

The Northern Tamir starts between the Shalkhagiin Khoit mountain range and the Togoo Mountain in the Ikh-Tamir sum. The southern Tamir starts about 25 km to the south-west in the Bulgan sum at the end of the Khairkhny mountain range. The two branches run a roughly north-eastern course up to their confluence at the sum center of Battsengel sum.

The Tamir is a main tributary of the Orkhon River, which it meets in Ögii Nuur sum, opposite to the namesake Ögii Lake.

See also 

 Tamir

References 

Rivers of Mongolia